The Kingdom of Viguera (Basque: Viguerako Erresuma) was a small ephemeral subsidiary kingdom centered on the town of Viguera from 970 into the early 11th century. The kingdom was created by King García Sánchez I of Pamplona for the eldest son of his second marriage, Ramiro Garcés, who became the first king of Viguera. He was succeeded by two sons who ruled jointly, but on the death of the survivor of the two, sometime between 1005 and 1030, Viguera was reabsorbed into the main Pamplona kingdom.

The kingdom was carved out of the south of the Kingdom of Pamplona. Its territory encompassed the valleys of the Iregua and Leza rivers in the heartland of the present-day Rioja. It probably also included Meltria. It was an artificial creation, lacking ethnic or geographical distinctness. The kings of Viguera were always subject to their superiors ruling in Pamplona. After 1005, the territory ceased to be a separate kingdom and became just another tenancy of the crown.

In the year 918 Ordoño II of León and Sancho I of Pamplona invaded Viguera to clear out the Banu Qasi dynasty from the land. By 923, the area had been subdued and fortified. From 924 and until the year 972 the land around Viguera was ruled by Fortún Galíndez, who had the title of Duke of Viguera.

García Sánchez I of Pamplona, left as heir to the Kingdom of Pamplona his first son by his first marriage, Sancho II. After the insistence of his second wife, Teresa of León, García I willed Viguera to his first son with her, Ramiro Garcés. After the death of García I, his son Sancho II, acting as King of Pamplona, recognised his half-brother's rights over Viguera. Ramiro was succeeded in the throne by his son, Sancho Ramírez in 991. Sancho's brother, García Ramírez acted as co-king prior to his brother's death in 1002 or shortly thereafter. García left only daughters and simply disappears from the historical record between 1005 and 1030. Later on Viguera appears again as being part of the Kingdom of Pamplona.

List of monarchs 
 Ramiro Garcés, from 970 until his death in 981.
 Sancho Ramírez, from 981 until his death c. 1002.
 García Ramírez, around 1002.

Notes

Sources 

Basque history
10th century in Navarre
States and territories established in the 970s
970 establishments
Viguera
Viguera
Viguera
States and territories disestablished in the 1000s
1000s disestablishments in Europe
History of La Rioja (Spain)